Ten Speed Press is a publishing house founded in Berkeley, California in 1971 by Phil Wood. Ten Speed Press was bought by Random House in February 2009 and is now part of their Crown Publishing Group division.

History
Wood worked with Barnes & Noble in 1962,  Penguin Books in 1965, and had a senior sales position at Penguin Books in Baltimore and New York before founding Ten Speed Press. Wood died of cancer in December 2010.

Ten Speed's first book was Anybody’s Bike Book, which is still in print. It inspired the publisher's name and has sold more than a million copies. Ten Speed's all-time best-seller is What Color is Your Parachute? A Practical Manual for Job-Hunters and Career-Changers by Richard N. Bolles (1972). It has been reissued in new editions and, as of 2009, has sold more than ten million copies, translated into 20 languages.

Ten Speed has published numerous other non-fiction titles, including Moosewood Cookbook, White Trash Cooking, Why Cats Paint, The Bread Baker's Apprentice, Vegetable Literacy, Yotam Ottolenghi's Jerusalem, Franklin Barbecue, and Marie Kondo's The Life-Changing Magic of Tidying Up (2014).  The books are usually colorfully designed. They are sometimes published in odd shapes to match their whimsical subjects. Ten Speed Press publishes 150 books a year under all of its imprints.

In 1983, Ten Speed acquired Celestial Arts, (Millbrae, CA) "founded in the late 1960s as a printer of rock music posters", from Gary Kurtz, a Star Wars producer. In 2002, the company acquired Crossing Press, a publisher specializing in metaphysics, alternative lifestyles, and healing.

In February 2009, Ten Speed Press was bought by Random House and is now part of their Crown Publishing Group division. Before the takeover, it published under its four imprints, Ten Speed Press, Celestial Arts, Crossing Press, and Tricycle Press, more than 100 new hardcovers and trade paperbacks annually and had a backlist of more than 1,000 active titles.

Watson-Guptill became an imprint of Ten Speed Press under Random House in 2013, part of their Crown Publishing Group.

Tricycle Press
Tricycle Press was the children's imprint of Ten Speed Press, which published the Amelia's notebooks series, among others. Tricycle also published Who's in a Family? in 1997 and King & King in 2002, books that addressed different types of families, including those headed by gay parents.  The imprint ceased publishing new books in 2011.

References

External links
 Ten Speed Press

Publishing companies established in 1971
Book publishing companies based in Berkeley, California
Random House